Standon could be:
Standon, Hampshire
Standon, Hertfordshire
Standon, Staffordshire
Standon Green End, Hertfordshire

See also
Standen